Mohamed Abdel Khalek Allam (1921 – January 2011) was an Egyptian diver. He competed in the men's 10 metre platform event at the 1948 Summer Olympics. Outside of sports, he was an educator.

References

1921 births
2011 deaths
Egyptian male divers
Olympic divers of Egypt
Divers at the 1948 Summer Olympics
Sportspeople from Cairo
20th-century Egyptian people
21st-century Egyptian people